Hellgrammite (Roderick Rose) is a supervillain appearing in comic books published by DC Comics, commonly as an enemy of Superman Batman the Creeper Green Arrow And Black Canary 

In the series Supergirl, the Hellgrammite is portrayed by Justice Leak.

Publication history
Hellgrammite made his debut in The Brave and the Bold #80 (November 1968) created by Bob Haney and Neal Adams. In this issue, he battled Batman and the Creeper.

Fictional character biography

Pre-Crisis
An entomologist named Roderick Rose, the Hellgrammite subjects himself to a mutagenic process that transforms him into a grasshopper-like insectoid. He has superhuman strength and leaping abilities, the power to crawl upon walls, weave transformative or imprisoning cocoons, and a durable exoskeleton. A number of his schemes revolve around transforming others into weaker, subordinate versions of himself, leading to clashes with Batman and the Creeper in The Brave and the Bold #80, and with Green Arrow and the Black Canary in World's Finest Comics #248-249.

Post-Crisis
In the Post-Crisis DC Universe, the Hellgrammite returns as a recurring foe for Superman, first encountering the Man of Steel after being hired (by then-LexCorp board member George Markham) to kill Lex Luthor. During the Underworld Unleashed crossover, he makes a deal with Neron, trading his soul in return for increased physical powers and an improved ability to transform others into his drones. In a one-shot issue, Underworld Unleashed: Patterns of Fear #1, it was stated that he had once used the alias Robert Dobson.

Although there were rumors of Hellgrammite's death as a member of the Suicide Squad during the Imperiex crisis, it was instead a similar villain named the Larvanaut who died. He has been seen alive One Year Later, still a member of Superman's rogues' gallery, acting as an assassin for Intergang.

Following the destruction of Star City at the hands of Prometheus, the new Batman leads a newly formed Justice League in a hunt to track down the various villains who helped Prometheus in his plot. The team finds Hellgrammite and several other villains attempting to flee the country and a battle ensues. Hellgrammite is ultimately defeated after Donna Troy ties up a villainess named Harpi with her lasso, and then swings her into the villain, knocking both of them out.

Powers and abilities
Hellgrammite is super-strong and durable, able to jump long distances, secrete adhesives, and produce cocoons for imprisoning his foes or transforming them into drone versions of himself. In both forms, he has expertise in entomology.

In other media

Television
 Hellgrammite makes non-speaking appearances in Justice League Unlimited. Following a minor appearance in the episode "The Cat and the Canary" as a participant in Roulette's "Meta-Brawl", he returns in the episode "Alive!" as a member of Gorilla Grodd's Secret Society. Prior to and during the latter episode, Lex Luthor took command of the group, but Grodd mounts a mutiny. Hellgrammite sides with the latter and defeats the Cheetah, but ends up frozen by Killer Frost and killed off-screen by Darkseid along with Grodd's other loyalists.
 Hellgrammite appears in the Batman: The Brave and the Bold episode "Time Out for Vengeance!", voiced by John DiMaggio. 
 Hellgrammite appears in Supergirl, portrayed by Justice Leak. This version is part of an alien race called Hellgrammites who possesses the ability to camouflage himself as a humanoid, superhuman strength, and the ability to shoot spikes capable of piercing metal, though he requires DDT sources to survive as it is the closest analogue to his people's food. Additionally, he was imprisoned in a Phantom Zone maximum security prison called Fort Rozz before it crash-landed on Earth, allowing the inmates to escape. In the first season episode "Stronger Together", he is forced by fellow escapee Astra In-Ze to kidnap her niece Supergirl, but he is foiled by the latter's sister Alex Danvers and incarcerated in a Department of Extranormal Operations (DEO) facility. In the fourth season episode "Ahimsa", a DEO mole allows Mercy and Otis Graves to stage a prison break so they can provoke hostile relations towards aliens. After escaping and being hypnotized by Ben Lockwood into causing chaos, Hellgrammite attacks a carnival until he is defeated by Supergirl, though he kills the Graveses for appearing to threaten her before surrendering to the DEO.

Miscellaneous
Hellgrammite appears in issue #17 of Adventures in the DC Universe.

References

Characters created by Bob Haney
Characters created by Neal Adams
Comics characters introduced in 1968
DC Comics characters with superhuman strength
DC Comics male supervillains
DC Comics metahumans
DC Comics scientists
Fictional characters with superhuman durability or invulnerability
Fictional entomologists
Fictional geneticists